On the Old Fall River Line is a song composed in 1913  by William Jerome (words), Andrew B. Sterling (words) and Harry Von Tilzer (music) set on a steamship of the Fall River Line of steamships between New York and Newport, Rhode Island, which connected with trains from Newport to Boston. Von Tilzer had often traveled the line and was inspired by honeymooners "stirred to romantic depths by the alliance of shadowy darkness, twinkling stars, softly lapping waves and stately moving ships." Popular  during World War I, especially among New England soldiers, it was also "much parodied." It is a cheerful, up-tempo ditty, but, typically of its time, "there is a final twist to married bliss with the final chorus line of: 'But I wish "oh Lord" I fell overboard, On the old Fall River Line.'" Described by the New York Times as "a popular song of a quarter century ago" in 1937, its full chorus was used that same year in Time Magazine's article on the passing of the old steamboat line. Although still garnering a place in Billboards 1949 listing of "Harry Von Tilzer's Best Known Songs" as late as 1949  and being described as "a famous verse" by The Christian Science Monitor in 1950,  a dozen years after the last ship had sailed, it is less remembered today, although not completely forgotten. Modern-day performers have included Steve Martin and Tiny Tim.

Chorus
On the old Fall River line
On the old Fall River lineI fell for Susie’s line of talk 
And Susie fell for mine 
Then we fell in with a parson 
And he tied us tight as twine 
But I wish ‘oh Lord’  
I fell over board 
On the old Fall River line

Recordings
 Billy Murray, recorded 1913-08-06, Victor Talking Machine Co. B 13673.  According to the Fall River Historical Society, it was "recorded entirely on location in Fall River, Massachusetts". From January 1914, appeared on US Billboard for three weeks, charting as high as #6.
 Arthur Collins and Byron G. Harlan, 1913, Columbia A1419 (see Arthur Collins, 1910s discography). From January 1914, appeared on US Billboard for four weeks, charting as high as #5.
 The Melody Men, on Barber Shop Favourites'', Solitaire Manhattan Record SRO-452.
 Victor Military Band, recorded 1914-02-05, Victor 35334.

References

External links
 Sheet music: verses and chorus
 Full lyrics: mudcat.org
 Variant lyrics: Steve Martin bio
 Lyrics with chord progressions: "On the Old Fall River Line" from Sailor Songs, sea shanty lyrics, sea shanties
 On the Old Fall River Line at the Internet Music Database • QuickTime trailer from  YouTube https://www.youtube.com/watch?v=15PMnYEUEW0
 Fall River Historical Society 
 An especially fine capsule description of the song and each of the three songwriters can be found at Parlor Songs Association, Dec 2003 Issue

1913 songs
Songs with lyrics by William Jerome
Songs with music by Harry Von Tilzer
Songs with lyrics by Andrew B. Sterling